The commune of Bukeye is a commune of Muramvya Province in central-western Burundi. The capital lies at Bukeye.

References

Communes of Burundi
Muramvya Province